Jarasandha is an Indian Kannada action crime thriller film directed by Shashank and starring Duniya Vijay. It was dubbed in Hindi as Jaraasandha.

Plot
Krishamurthy, alias Kitty (Duniya Vijay) is a gym trainer, who is happy leading life with his mother (Roopa Devi). His aim is to win the Mr. India title and Naidu (Rangayana Raghu) is sponsoring him by bearing all his expenses. Don Poojari heads a gang and operates from Dubai, whose men are assassinated by another gang, "Z". Samantha (Pranitha) comes in between and falls for Kitty. Kitty has a hidden face or horror which is kept secret from the outside world. Meanwhile, the cops are waiting for the arrival of Ravi Poojari after his brother was killed by Z gang. Later, it is all about the battle between the two gangs to rule the underworld.

Cast

Production
Jarasandha, in the direction of director Shashank, has completed shooting in the Bidar fort and surroundings of Basavakalyana. In Rs.70 lakhs expenditure this song was shot featuring Vijay and Pranitha. The foreign dancers were part of this song.

Another song, "Padhe Padhe Phoninalli" was shot in four days at Bangkok featuring Vijay, Pranitha and other African dancers. Dance Master Harsha has choreographed for both the songs.

Music of the song "Nee Neerige Bare Channi" was based on the Sinhalese song "Mata Aloke Genadevi".

Soundtrack

The audio album of Jarasandha was released in September 2011. The five songs of the album tuned by Arjun Janya were released by well known actors. Yogaraj Bhat and Shashank have written the lyrics for the songs.

The Jarasandha soundtrack album has been well received in the market according to sources.

Reception

Critical response 

Shruti Indira Lakshminarayana from Rediff.com scored the film at 2 out of 5 stars and says "Shashank had promised a stylish action flick and with Vijay at the helm, that was what was expected. But the film comes as a disappointment". A critic from Bangalore Mirror wrote  "Without Arjun Janya's music, Harsha’s cute concepts for the songs and Shekar Chandra's cinematography which reaches credible heights in scenes like the temple car festival, Jarasandha would have been relegated to a much poorer film. And unlike Johnny, there is no Ramya's special dance to look forward to". A critic from The New Indian Express wrote "As far as Vijay’s performance is concerned, he has excelled in stunt sequences. Pranitha has acted well. Songs are good. It is worth watching if you are fond of action-oriented films". B S Srivani from Deccan Herald wrote "The only drawback, if it can be called that, is the ‘message’ getting buried under the avalanche of tastefully shot songs, which are not necessarily relevant. But when ‘old fashioned’ morals and values have restricted circulation, does this 'shortcoming' matter?".

References

2011 films
2010s Kannada-language films
Films directed by Shashank
Films scored by Arjun Janya
Films shot in Bangalore
Films shot in Bangkok